Emmerdale is a British soap opera first broadcast on 16 October 1972. The following is a list of characters that first appeared during 2022, by order of first appearance. All characters are introduced by the soap's executive producer, Jane Hudson. Marcus Dean (Darcy Grey) was introduced in February as the son of Pierce Harris (Jonathan Wrather). He was followed by Mary Goskirk (Louise Jameson), the mother of Rhona Goskirk (Zoë Henry), in March. Then in April, Martelle Edinborough joined the cast as Suzy Merton, a love interest for Vanessa Woodfield (Michelle Hardwick). Karene Peter then debuted in June as Naomi Walters, the daughter of Charles Anderson (Kevin Mathurin). Then, in December, William Ash joined the cast as Caleb Miligan, the half-brother of Cain Dingle (Jeff Hordley) and Chas Dingle (Lucy Pargeter). Additionally, multiple other characters appeared in 2022.

Marcus Dean

Marcus Dean, played by Darcy Grey, made his first appearance on 3 February 2022. He was introduced as the son of established former character Pierce Harris (Jonathan Wrather), who is in prison due to murdering Graham Foster (Andrew Scarborough). Justin Harp of Digital Spy wrote that Marcus arrives in the fictional village with his own traumatic experiences from living with Pierce, who abused his mother. Harp wrote that Marcus shares numerous traits with Pierce, such as his brooding, suaveness and good looks. He also questioned whether Marcus would share Pierce's violent attributes. Grey later said that Marcus believes he is not like Pierce, but as his storylines evolve, he shares more similarities to Pierce. Producer Kate Brooks said that Marcus' arrival will "ruffle a few feathers and flutter a few hearts in the village" and confirmed that viewers would soon realise that he is more than the son of Pierce. However, Brooks hinted that some villagers may not be as accepting of Marcus due to him potentially being "forever doomed to live in the shadow of his father's heinous crimes". Rhona Goskirk (Zoë Henry), who was raped by Pierce, is worried by Marcus' arrival in the village. Inside Soap wrote that her life "is to be turned upside down" by his arrival and that the story would see her happiness with partner Marlon Dingle (Mark Charnock) threatened.

Grey said that when his agent sent him the character, he was "quietly smiling inside". He described the moment he was cast in the role as "one of those pinch-yourself moments actors simply dream of", especially since he felt he could connect to Marcus and shared attributes with him. Prior to his casting, he was working as a dog food salesman, and whilst in the audition process for the role, he watched the original storyline between Pierce and Rhona to get an idea for his character's father. Grey described Marcus as an outcast and an open book with an uncertain future, hinting that his initial storylines see him want to be loved and escape the reputation of his father. He added that he was excited for viewers of the soap to meet Marcus and watch his journey. Executive producer Jane Hudson also revealed that Pierce would become romantically involved with an established character and to watch his scenes to see a "new romance blossom". Dan Seddon, also of Digital Spy, wrote that he would "flirt his way around Emmerdale village". The romantic connection is later revealed to be with Ethan Anderson (Emile John), who stops Marcus from leaving the village after feeling unwanted. Their relationship "takes a step in the right direction" when they eventually decide to move in together.

For his portrayal of Marcus, Grey was nominated for the British Soap Award for Best Newcomer at the 2022 ceremony.

Mary Goskirk

Mary Goskirk, played by Louise Jameson, made her first appearance on 7 March 2022. She was introduced as the mother of established character of Rhona (Goskirk), whom she has a "strained relationship" with. Mary was described by Digital Spy's Hannah Bird as a "no nonsense" character and noted that Rhona feels as though she can never live up to her expectations. However, due to Marcus Dean's (Darcy Grey) arrival in the village causing upset for Rhona due to his connection to her rapist, Bird felt that Mary's arrival in the village could be "the prime opportunity for them to build bridges and heal their relationship". Her arrival initially unsettles Rhona as she feels there is a hidden agenda and treats her with suspicion, while other villagers "welcome her with open arms, finding her wit endearing". Bird hinted that despite her likeability in the village, it would not be long before she had arguments with villagers.

On joining Emmerdale, Jameson said: "It feels like such a gift to be welcomed into the Emmerdale cast. Playing Zoe's on-screen mum is the icing on the cake." Producer Laura Shaw was thrilled to welcome Jameson into the cast, noting that her experience in the industry would be "a fabulous asset to the show". On the character, Shaw added that she is intelligent, witty and complex and that for Rhona, "there won't ever be a dull moment whilst her domineering mother is around". Metros Sabrina Barr wrote that Mary has a bold persona due to her "quick-witted and headstrong". Barr also confirmed Rhona's suspicions about Mary by revealing that Mary does have a hidden reason for her move to the village. She also noted Jameson's former experience on the soap, having played Sharon Crossthwaite in 1973, a cousin of Annie Sugden (Sheila Mercier).

Writers lined up a "surprise friendship" between Mary and Kim Tate (Claire King) and as part of their budding friendship, Kim quizzes Mary on her life. Mary "suddenly becomes evasive" with details of her love life, but later confides in Kim that she is a lesbian. She details a relationship she once had with her neighbour named Louise, who died. Kim encourages Mary to tell Rhona about her sexuality, who she hopes will be supportive. However, Rhona feels betrayed and feels as though her family life was based on a lie, and "cruelly outs her" to everybody in the Woolpack.

Suzy Merton

Suzy Merton, played by Martelle Edinborough, made her first appearance on 30 March 2022. She was introduced as a love interest for Vanessa Woodfield (Michelle Hardwick). The pair meet when Vanessa bumps into Suzy, who is carrying a cake that gets ruined by the accident. Despite the "slightly mortifying introduction", they meet a week later and share a flirty interaction, which leads to a dinner date. On her casting on the soap, Edinborough said: "My feet haven't quite touched the ground yet, I'm still on this massive cloud high up in the sky, but it's been going really, really good. It's just like a family, and it sounds so cliché but it really is and everyone is so lovely and welcoming and helps you settle in really nicely." Edinborough had just gotten out of the shower when she learned of her casting and recalled dramatically falling to her knees when her agent informed her that she had booked the role. She felt that especially due to being from Leeds, where Emmerdale is filmed, the job was perfect for her.

Of Suzy, the actress said that she is a fun, confident and gregarious character who "doesn't take any nonsense and likes to get what she wants". Edinborough said that there are several different storylines coming up for Suzy which she was excited for. She hinted that one of these could be her budding romance with Vanessa since she believed the pair have a connection. She felt that Suzy is "pleasantly surprised with Vanessa, she's got something about her that Suzy likes and she's not quite sure what as yet". Another of Suzy's storylines was her surprise connection to established character Leyla Harding (Roxy Shahidi). When Leyla learns of Suzy's budding relationship with Vanessa, she warns her that she cannot pursue a relationship with someone from her village due to the past the pair share. It was later revealed the pair deal drugs together.

Naomi Walters

Naomi Walters, played by Karene Peter, made her first uncredited appearance on 14 June 2022, with her first credited appearance airing on 5 July 2022. She was introduced as the daughter of Charles (Kevin Mathurin) and Esme (Eva Fontaine), and the younger sister of Ethan (Emile John). Naomi was initially referenced on the soap in October 2021 when Esme mentions her to Charles. Her backstory involves being put up for adoption by Esme, who was cheated on by Charles and suffered from postpartum depression. Esme and Naomi later met up, but Charles had refused to meet her. When Charles learns that Naomi has gone missing, he feels responsible for her disappearance so he hunts for her. He discovers her working in a bar, arguing with her boss. Charles defends her in the argument and knocks her boss over.

On her character, Peter said that Naomi has "got a bit of an edge and she's a little bit misunderstood". Naomi is going through an angsty and rebellious period at the point of her introduction, which Peter clarified is nothing to do with her being adopted. She also confirmed that Naomi's adoptive family are loving and that she grew up in a loving family unit. Peter opined that the reason for Naomi's rebellious streak comes from abandonment issues with her biological parents. She explained that while Naomi's relationship with Esme had improved from when they were estranged, it was not the "rose-tinted, fairytale, mother/daughter relationship" that she wanted. Charles initially not wanting to know Naomi had also given her a bad impression of him.

On the scenes where Naomi meets Charles, Peter said: "Charles is there and has been looking for her, unbeknownst to her. He's been watching this interaction between her and her manager take place and it escalates to the point where he intervenes. In that intervention, he blurts out that Naomi is his daughter. So that kind of shocks her to the core a little bit. She doesn't know how to react to it in that moment." Mathurin explained that Charles did not plan on revealing that he was Naomi's father in that way, but afterwards, he affirms that he wants to get to know her. However, due to Charles being an empathetic character, he would go at the pace Naomi allows the relationship to go at, and if she did not want to know Charles, he would respect that.

In August 2022, it was revealed that Naomi witnessed the attack of Nicola King (Nicola Wheeler), which aired in June of that year, but did nothing to help. When Nicola recognises her, Naomi does not, as she has blocked the traumatic night from her memories. Speaking from her character's perspective, Peter explained that she wants a place of belonging and temporarily found it with the girls who attacked Nicola. However, she did not support the attack and Peter clarified that Naomi does feel guilt towards not doing anything to help. Later in August, writers paired her in scenes with Nate Robinson (Jurell Carter) and confirmed that they would become a romantic couple. Naomi is shown to be very confident and flirty whilst pursuing Nate and he falls for charms quickly.

Caleb Miligan

Caleb Miligan, played by William Ash, made his first appearance on 25 December 2022. The character and Ash's casting details were announced on 26 November 2022. Of his casting, Ash stated "I'm thrilled to be joining such an iconic show. Emmerdale is packed full of fantastic actors and I'm really looking forward to working alongside them. Caleb is a fantastically complex character and I can't wait to get stuck in." Caleb is introduced as the long-lost brother of Cain Dingle (Jeff Hordley) and Chas Dingle (Lucy Pargeter). His presence causes issues between Cain and Chas, as she learns that Cain knew all about Caleb and kept him a secret from her. Caleb was billed as "calm and in control, rich and successful, at first glance Caleb is everything his brother isn't, but will the pair find they have more in common than they thought?" It was also teased that Caleb's arrival would "shake things up" for the Dingle family.

Other characters

Notes

References

External links
 Characters and cast at itv.com
 Characters and cast at IMDb

Emmerdale
2022
, Emmerdale